Project Phoenix is an ongoing programme within the South African National Defence Force (SANDF) to revive its Reserve Force and bring it on a par with the Regular Force under a "One Force policy."

The aim is to reach a point whereby members of the Reserve Force can be easily substituted for those of the Regular Force for combat operations, thus easing the requirement to sustain a large Regular Force.

Military history of South Africa